The News at Ten or Ten O'Clock News is a news program that usually airs in the late evening on a TV channel. It may refer to:

 ITV News at Ten (1967–1999; 2001–2004; 2008–present), or more commonly News at Ten, the main late evening newscast on ITV in the United Kingdom, produced by ITN
 The Ten O'Clock News (WGBH) (1976–1991), a defunct evening newscast on WGBH-TV Boston
 Sky News at Ten (1999–present), on Sky News
 BBC News at Ten (2000–present), formerly BBC Ten O'Clock News, the main late evening newscast on BBC One in the United Kingdom
 A song on the album New Clear Days by The Vapors

See also
 One O'Clock News (disambiguation)
 Five O'Clock News (disambiguation)
 Six O'Clock News (disambiguation)
 Nine O'Clock News (disambiguation)